Water polo at the 2018 Asian Games was held at the Gelora Bung Karno Aquatic Stadium, Gelora Bung Karno Sports Complex, Jakarta, Indonesia from 16 August to 1 September. Ten countries with 9 men's team and 6 women's team participated in the competition.

Schedule

Medalists

Medal table

Draw 
A draw ceremony was held on 5 July 2018 to determine the groups for the men's competition. The teams were seeded based on their final ranking at the 2014 Asian Games. The women were played in round robin format.

Group A
 (1)
 (4)

Group B
 (2)
 (3)

Final standing

Men

Women

References

External links
Water polo at the 2018 Asian Games
Official Result Book – Water Polo

 
2018 Asian Games events
2018
Asian Games
2018 Asian Games